Elmer Edward Feig (May 9, 1897 - October 20, 1968) was an American unlicensed architect credited with designing over 81 apartment buildings between 1925 and 1931 in Portland, Oregon. Feig also designed single-family residences. Many of Feig's designs survived urban renewal and have become a central feature of Portland neighborhoods. Some of Feig's buildings are listed on the National Register of Historic Places.

Early years
Elmer Edward Feig was born May 9, 1897, in Atwater, Minnesota. Within a few years, the family moved to Barnes County, North Dakota, where Elmer's father worked as a hardware store clerk. The family settled in Portland in 1910.

Feig's first job was as a draftsperson with the Portland firm of Fenner Redicut Homes in 1914. He began working as a structural and mechanical architect in Vancouver, Washington, for G. M. Standifer Construction Company in 1916 where he remained for three years. From 1919 to 1927, Feig worked as an inspector and plans examiner at the Portland City Bureau of Buildings, a forerunner of the Planning and Sustainability Commission. Feig designed the Keller House while working for the Bureau of Buildings.

Elmer Feig's first wife was Gladys Kunich, and they had two children. The Feigs divorced in the 1930s. Feig married his second wife, Dora, later in the 1930s.

Architecture
In 1928, Feig started the Architectural Services Bureau and began working as a full-time architect, although he referred to himself as a building designer. One of his first commercial clients was Harry Mittleman, who constructed several apartment buildings from designs provided by Feig, including Blackstone Apartments. Blackstone is an Egyptian Revival structure cited as a key example of Feig's work. A typical Feig design included a raised basement, three to five stories, a flat roof, and parapets raised higher at the middle and the corners. Feig experimented with various revival styles where exotic motifs were applied to ordinary apartment structures, often including relief panels and cast stone decorations. The building form was also important to Feig, and he experimented with courtyards and gardens attached to U-shapes and L-shaped forms.

From the late-1920s to the early-1930s, Feig designed over 81 apartment buildings and at least seven houses. Normally working alone, Feig collaborated with Harry Herzog of the firm Bennes & Herzog on at least one design but at separate times.

Later years
Little else is known of Elmer Feig. His work in Florida has not been documented, and his legacy will remain in the Portland neighborhoods where his buildings are cherished.

He returned to Oregon in 1965 and retired in Newberg. Elmer Feig died October 20, 1968.

List of buildings
Many of Elmer Feig's designs have been demolished, but the following list from the Oregon Historic Sites Database and other sources includes at least most of those left standing.

See also
Architecture of Portland, Oregon

References

External links
 Portland Historic and Conservation Districts
 Oregon Historic Sites Database

Architects from Portland, Oregon
1897 births
1968 deaths
People from Kandiyohi County, Minnesota